Per Frøistad (29 August 1911 – 2 June 1991) was a Norwegian footballer. He played in one match for the Norway national football team in 1939.

References

External links
 
 

1911 births
1991 deaths
Norwegian footballers
Norway international footballers
Place of birth missing
Association football forwards
Lyn Fotball players